The 2019 Israeli airstrikes in Iraq began as unidentified drone or aircraft bombings of the Iranian-backed Popular Mobilization Forces (PMF) bases in Iraq starting on 19 July 2019. The strikes targeted Iranian proxy groups, based in Iraq, as well as IRGC operatives.

Several Iraqi, Iranian and Israeli officials have blamed Israel for the attacks, though Israel had initially neither confirmed nor denied its role. Israeli Prime Minister Benjamin Netanyahu hinted responsibility for the attacks on 20 August 2019, claiming that "Iran is not immune anywhere". Israel confirmed responsibility for the strikes on 22 August 2019, which was later followed by a US confirmation.

Timeline

Amirli strike
On 19 July 2019 unidentified drones bombed a base belonging to the Iranian-backed Popular Mobilization Forces base in Iraq, close to the town of Amirli. An airstrike wounded two Iranians after it struck a base that housed advisers from Iran and Lebanon, while a second strike hit a weapons depot, causing a large fire and the destruction of several ballistic missiles. The US Central Command CENTCOM denied responsibility for the bombing.

Iran reported on July 30 that the attack had killed a senior Islamic Revolutionary Guard Corps (IRGC) commander Abu Alfazl Sarabian.

Camp Ashraf strike
On 27 July 2019 Camp Ashraf, one of the biggest bases in Iraq, was attacked by what Iraqi military sources described as one or more Israeli Air Force jets. The attack struck a consignment of ballistic missile launchers and living quarters of IRGC officers and PMF personnel. Some sources reported that up to 40 people were killed in the attack. According to Iraqi and Iranian sources the attacks were carried out by Israeli F-35 aircraft.

Southern Baghdad strike
Explosions rocked a PMF weapons depot in southern Baghdad on 12 August killing one and injuring 29 civilians. A spokesman for Iraq's Interior Minister said that an examination of the warehouse showed that the explosion was not caused by an internal failure but by a third party that attacked the warehouse and caused a fire.

Iraq closed its airspace to all unauthorized flights on 13 August, including to the US coalition. Iraqi Prime Minister also ordered all military camps and munitions warehouses to be moved outside Iraqi cities following the explosions that killed one civilian and wounded 29.

30th Brigade's headquarters strike
On 17 August, unidentified warplanes targeted the 30th Brigade's headquarters, which is affiliated with the Popular Mobilization Forces.

Balad strike
Blasts hit a PMF arms depot on 20 August close to the Balad Air Base. A PMF source said the arms depot was specifically targeted by an aerial bombardment.

Al-Qa'im
On 25 August 2019 a PMF convoy was hit by two drones near the Syrian–Iraqi border town of Al-Qa'im, killing six, including a senior commander. PMF blamed Israel for the attack. It came as Hezbollah leader Hassan Nasrallah was making a speech in response to an alleged Israeli attack at their stronghold in Dahieh, Lebanon.

Hit strike
On 20 September, loud explosions were reported at a warehouse near the city of Hit in Anbar Province, northwest of Baghdad. Sky News Arabic reported that after the blast, shells were launched into neighboring areas, indicating an arms depot may have been hit. Al-Arabiya also reported that the warehouse was used to store weaponry and belonged to the Popular Mobilization Forces. al-Arabiya quoted an Iraqi officer claiming there was a drone in the area at the time of the explosions. As result of the explosions, 21 Iraqi militants of the Popular Mobilization Forces were killed.

Tafuf Brigade strike
On 22 September, violent explosions caused by airstrikes took place at a base belonging to "Liwa al-Tafuf" 13th Brigade of the Popular Mobilisation Units. An Iraqi security official told The New Arab that drones may have been used in the attack.

Responsibility
On 22 August 2019 Israeli Prime Minister Benjamin Netanyahu confirmed that Israel had been carrying out operations against Iran in Iraq, saying "We are working against Iranian consolidation—in Iraq as well." US officials also confirmed that Israel was behind the attacks later in the day.

See also
 Operation Opera
 Israeli–Syrian ceasefire line incidents during the Syrian civil war

References

2019 in Iraq
July 2019 events in Iraq
August 2019 events in Iraq
Conflicts in 2019
2019 airstrikes
2019 in international relations
Airstrikes conducted by Israel
Cross-border operations into Iraq
Iran–Israel proxy conflict
Iraq–Israel relations